The Lloyd's War Medal for Bravery at Sea is one of the four Lloyd's Medal types bestowed by Lloyd's of London. In 1939, with the coming of the Second World War, Lloyd's set up a committee to find means of honouring seafarers who performed acts of exceptional courage at sea, and this resulted in the announcement on 27 December 1940 of the "Lloyd’s War Medal for Bravery at Sea".

The first awards were announced in March 1941. The first two were to Captain Rowland Morris-Woolfenden MBE and Sub-Lieutenant Patrick Wills-Rust RNR, who had been Master and Second Officer respectively of the coaster . On the night of 27–28 May 1940, the last day of the Battle of Belgium, she had evacuated over 200 soldiers and civilians from Ostend. She survived 90 minutes of attacks by enemy aircraft and 20 minutes of attack by an E-boat before being torpedoed and sunk.

All awards were for acts during the Second World War. The last were announced in October 1948. In all 541 Lloyd's War Medals for Bravery at Sea were awarded. Four were awarded to women: Miss Victoria Drummond, Miss M. E.Ferguson, Miss E. M. Owen, and Mrs. E. Plumb.

In the table the following abbreviations and annotations are used:

C – King's Commendation for Brave Conduct.

† – Posthumous, * – Honorary, § – Supernumerary, A/ – Acting, T/ – Temporary.

References

Sources

See also

Convoy rescue ship
Merchant Navy

1939 establishments in the United Kingdom
Battle of the Atlantic
Civil awards and decorations of the United Kingdom
Courage awards
Decorations of the Merchant Navy